Hawaiian lava sledding  (Hawaiian: hee hōlua, "sled surfing") is a traditional sport of the Native Hawaiians. In the past, Hawaiian lava sledding was considered both a sport and a religious ritual for honoring the gods.

Sleds

Papa hōlua are composed of a pair of runners and a superstructure (platform). The runners are made from hard native woods, traditionally that of kauila (Alphitonia ponderosa or Colubrina oppositifolia), uhiuhi (Caesalpinia kavaiensis), or māmane (Sophora chrysophylla).  The runners have up-curved fore edges, straight aft edges, and rounded lower edges. Crosspieces keep the runners apart.  The superstructure, two rails smaller in diameter than the runners and spaced apart by pieces of bamboo, sits on top of the crosspieces. The runners, crosspieces, and rails are bound together with sennit cordage.  The rails are wrapped in white kapa cloth and the rail frame is covered in lauhala matting. Oil from kukui (Aleurites moluccana) nuts coats either the course or the runners to provide lubrication.

Courses
A kahua hōlua foundation, which is made of rocks, is built in a depression on a hillside.  The foundation is covered in packed-in dirt and an outer layer of pili grass (Heteropogon contortus) or kō (Saccharum officinarum) flower tassels.  Courses are wide enough for a single sled and are not sloped at the bottom.  A skilled rider can travel  on the course, reaching the flat portion.

References

Hawaiiana
Sledding
Sports originating in the United States
Indigenous sports and games of the Americas